John Rutledge Jr. (1766September 1, 1819) was a United States representative from South Carolina. Born in Charles Town in the Province of South Carolina, he was a son of John Rutledge, who was President of South Carolina, Governor of South Carolina, a Continental Congressman, Philadelphia Convention Framer of the United States Constitution, and Chief Justice of the Supreme Court of the United States, and a nephew of Edward Rutledge, another Continental Congressman from South Carolina. The younger John received private instruction and also attended school in Charleston and Philadelphia. He studied law with his father, was admitted to the bar about 1787 and practiced in Charleston; he also engaged as a planter. From 1794 to 1797, he was a member of the South Carolina House of Representatives. He was an unsuccessful candidate for election in 1794 to the Fourth Congress, and was elected as a Federalist to the Fifth, Sixth, and Seventh Congresses, serving from March 4, 1797, to March 3, 1803. He was an unsuccessful candidate for election to the Thirteenth Congress, and commanded a company of the Twenty-eighth Regiment, South Carolina Militia, in 1799. He was promoted to major and in 1804 succeeded to the command of the regiment and served as its commander in the War of 1812. He commanded the Seventh Brigade from 1816 until his death in Philadelphia.

On December 26, 1792, he married Sarah Motte Smith, daughter of the Right Reverend Robert Smith (1732–1801). Together they had seven children. In 1804 he caught his wife in an illicit affair with Dr. Horace Senter. He mortally wounded Dr. Senter in a duel. He and Sarah Motte signed articles of separation in 1809 and lived apart for the remainder of their lives.

In a curious incident in 1801, a letter to President Thomas Jefferson was sent from someone purporting to be Nicholas Geffroy, a silversmith in Newport, Rhode Island. The letter detailed accusations against many citizens and office-holders, and insisted that "A purification is necessary, & we cannot be purified unless you cleanse the Augean Stable completely." Geffroy received a response from Jefferson, but doubted its authenticity and denied having ever written to the President. The United States Senator Christopher Ellery, a local resident, vouched for its authenticity and apparently impounded the letter for return to Jefferson. Ellery in turn accused Rutledge, also then resident in Newport, of having forged this and another letter from Geffroy. These "Geffroy letters" were subsequently published in the Newport Rhode-Island Republican on September 18, 1802, under the headline "Rutledge's Letters To the President of the United States." As noted in that article, although Geffroy possessed some mastery of spoken English, it was doubted that he could write, "with any degree of correctness, a single sentence of the language." After a flurry of accusations and affidavits, Rutledge challenged Ellery to a duel, which he declined. Rutledge assaulted Ellery in January 1803, "publicly caning him and pulling him by the nose and ears". Although Rutledge vehemently maintained his innocence in the affair, he decided not to seek reelection in 1803 given the negative publicity.

Notes

References

 Letter to Thomas Jefferson from “Nicholas Geffroy,” 1 August 1801
 A Defence against Calumny; or, Haman, in the shape of C. Ellery, Esq., hung upon his own gallows. Being the substance of certain publications ... refuting the accusation against J. Rutledge, of writing two letters to the President of the United States, urging the "displacement" of all the Federalists in Rhode Island, and the appointment to office of such persons as should be recommended by C. Ellery, John RUTLEDGE (Member of Congress.), Christopher ELLERY, 1803, pages 28–29.
 A Contribution to the Bibliography and Literature of Newport, R. I.: Comprising a List of Books Published Or Printed, in Newport, with Notes and Additions, Charles Edward Hammett, C. E. Hammett, jun. 1887, page 46.

External links
 

1766 births
1819 deaths
Members of the South Carolina House of Representatives
American militiamen in the War of 1812
Rutledge family
American planters
American duellists
Federalist Party members of the United States House of Representatives from South Carolina
American militia officers
Burials at St. Peter's churchyard, Philadelphia